Competent Tribunal is a term used in Article 5 paragraph 2 of the Third Geneva Convention, which states:

ICRC commentary on competent tribunals

The International Committee of the Red Cross (ICRC) commentary on Article 5 of the Third Geneva Convention says on the issue of competent tribunal that:

United States
Under U.S. military regulations, a Tribunal would be composed of:
Three commissioned officers; a written record of proceedings; proceedings shall be open with certain exceptions; persons whose status is to be determined shall be advised of their rights at the beginning of their hearings, allowed to attend all open sessions, allowed to call witnesses if reasonably available, and to question those witnesses called by the Tribunal, and to have a right to testify; and a tribunal shall determine status by a preponderance of evidence.

Possible determinations are:
Enemy Prisoner of War.
Recommended Retained Personnel (RP), entitled to EPW protections, who should be considered for certification as a medical, religious, or volunteer aid society RP.
Innocent civilian who should be immediately returned to his home or released.
Civilian Internee who for reasons of operational security, or probable cause incident to criminal investigation, should be detained.

"Competent tribunals" during the 1991 Gulf War
During the 1991 Gulf War, some detainees initially categorized as POWs were found to be innocent civilians who had surrendered to receive free food and lodging.  1,196 tribunals were convened, of which 310 individuals were granted POW status.  The remaining 886 detainees "were determined to be displaced civilians and were treated as refugees. No civilian was found to have acted as an unlawful combatant."

"Competent tribunals" in the context of the detainees held at Guantanamo Bay
This term began to receive a lot of attention when President George W. Bush announced that the United States would follow the Geneva Conventions as it was strictly interpreted, and that the war in Afghanistan did not fall within that purview.
As such, President Bush stated that fighters captured in the war in Afghanistan would be treated as "unlawful combatants".

Critics claimed that signatories to the Geneva Conventions, like the United States, are obliged to treat all captured combatants as if they qualified for POW status, until a "competent tribunal" considers their case and determines that they don't qualify for POW status.

The Supreme Court set aside this question in the case of Hamdan v. Rumsfeld.  Although it ruled against the Bush administration on the legality of the Guantanamo military commissions, it also determined that these detainees were due the rights accorded under the more limited Common Article 3.  It reserved judgement on Article 5 with its competent tribunals.

Combatant Status Review Tribunal as competent tribunals

Following the 2004 Rasul v. Bush ruling, the Bush administration began using Combatant Status Review Tribunals to determine the status of detainees.

The Bush administration tried to keep secret the identity of all the Guantanamo detainees.  But some detainees' identities leaked out.  Sympathetic lawyers secured permission from those detainees' families, and mounted legal challenges to try to secure their  human rights.  The Bush administration lost, and was forced to institute Combatant Status Review Tribunal.

The reviews determined only 38 detainees were not illegal combatants. Then, through some kind of mix-up, Murat Kurnaz's dossier was accidentally declassified.  
Critics examined its contents. It was hundreds of pages long.  All but one of the documents in Kurnaz's dossier established his innocence—established that there was no reason to believe he had any association with terrorism.  The lone exception was unsigned, and contained only a vague accusation.  This lone memo did not supply any evidence to back up its accusation that Kurnaz was acquainted with a suicide bomber—and the memo didn't even get that suicide bomber's name correctly.

Critics argued that since a single vague accusation had been enough to keep a detainee imprisoned, if one assumed his case was typical, it was reasonable to believe that many other detainees the reviews determined were illegal combatants may have been just as questionable.

Further, the Seton Hall studies conducted by lawyers for detainees found that 92% of detainees in Guantanamo Bay were not "al-Qaeda fighters" and they argue that the CSRT's were severely biased against suspects in favor of determining them unlawful combatants. The study itself reveals that those 92% who are not "al-Qaeda fighters" were deemed to be either other al-Qaeda members or Taliban or members of other affiliated hostile groups.

For this, and other reasons, opponents argued that the Combatant Status Review Tribunals do not constitute a competent tribunal as mandated by the Geneva Convention.  The Supreme Court ruled in Hamdan v. Rumsfeld that this was irrelevant, but it also ruled that the CSRT was not legal without congressional authorization. In response the Military Commissions Act was adopted.

See also
Command responsibility
Geneva Conventions
Jus in bello
UN Charter
Military Police: Enemy Prisoners of War, Retained Personnel, Civilian Internees and Other Detainees

References

Geneva Conventions